Garfield High School was a public high school located in Akron, Ohio, United States. At the time of its closure in 2017, it was one of seven high schools in the Akron Public Schools. Athletic teams were known as the Golden Rams and competed as members of the Akron City Series.

The school, established in 1926, closed after the 2016–17 school year and was merged with Kenmore High School while the Garfield High School building was razed. The merged school, initially known as Kenmore–Garfield High School, was housed at the Kenmore High School building from 2017 to 2022 while a new facility was built on the site of Garfield High School. Upon moving to the new site in 2022, the school was renamed Garfield Community Learning Center.

History
Garfield High School was named for James A. Garfield, 20th President of the United States. The school was formally dedicated on November 19, 1926. James R. Garfield, the son of the slain president, gave the principal address at the ceremony.

In 1928, the Ku Klux Klan lost its majority on the Akron School Board; the rule regarding the naming of newly constructed schools was eventually repealed, and Firestone High School was opened at a different location in 1963. In 1966, Garfield High School became the first comprehensive high school in Akron when it opened an addition for vocational education facilities.

Garfield merged with Kenmore High School for the 2017–18 school year due to declining enrollment and rising costs.  While the new building is constructed at the Garfield site, the combined school at the Kenmore location will be known as Kenmore-Garfield. Kenmore-Garfield High School opened in the fall of 2017.  

In May 2021, it was announced that the new building at the Garfield site would be called Garfield Community Learning Center, which the school board hoped would allow the Kenmore name to stay on a building in the Kenmore neighborhood.

Demographics
In the 2011–2012 school year, the average enrollment was 880 students. The student body was 62.1% black (non-Hispanic), 26.1% white (non-Hispanic), 5.5% multi-racial, 3.9% Asian/Pacific Islander, and 2.0% Hispanic. 87.7% of the students were classified as economically disadvantaged, and 22.1% had learning disabilities.

Notable alumni 

https://www.IMDB.com/SteveWargo

Ron Negray, Former MLB player (Brooklyn Dodgers, Philadelphia Phillies)
Antoine Winfield, former American football cornerback for the Buffalo Bills and Minnesota Vikings
Beanie Wells, former professional football player (halfback) for the Arizona Cardinals
Whitney Mercilus, professional football player (linebacker/defensive end) for the Green Bay Packers
Dave Brown (cornerback), professional football player (cornerback) and Super Bowl X Champion
Ray Wise, actor, most notably for his role as Leland Palmer in Twin Peaks
Thomas Lewis, former professional football player for the New York Giants
Rick Forzano, former head coach for the U.S. Naval Academy's football team and the Detroit Lions
Delma Byron, actress
Steve Wargo, Film Producer/Director, Poison Sky, Romans Road, The Controller, The Hoax,  https://pro.imdb.com/name/nm1854018
April Sutton, Delegate to the United Nations and the first face of Hollywood for BET (Black Entertainment Television).
Ti'Air Riggins, former Miss Indiana US 2015, first Black Biomedical Engineer bachelor's of science from Ohio State University and first Black Biomedical Engineering Doctorate of Philosophy from Michigan State University

External links
 District Website

Notes and references

High schools in Akron, Ohio
Public high schools in Ohio